This is a list of all tornadoes that were confirmed by local offices of the National Weather Service in the United States in June to August 2016.

United States yearly total

June

June 1 event

June 3 event

June 4 event

June 5 event

June 6 event

June 8 event

June 10 event

June 11 event

June 13 event

June 14 event

June 15 event

June 16 event

June 19 event

June 21 event

June 22 event

June 23 event

June 25 event

June 26 event

June 27 event

June 28 event

June 29 event

June 30 event

July

July 2 event

July 3 event

July 4 event

July 5 event

July 6 event

July 7 event

July 8 event

July 9 event

July 10 event

July 11 event

July 12 event

July 13 event

July 14 event

July 15 event

July 16 event

July 17 event

July 18 event

July 19 event

July 20 event

July 22 event

July 23 event

July 25 event

July 26 event

July 27 event

July 28 event

July 29 event

July 30 event

July 31 event

August

August 1 event

August 3 event

August 4 event

August 7 event

August 9 event

August 10 event

August 11 event

August 12 event

August 13 event

August 14 event

August 15 event

August 16 event

August 17 event

August 18 event

August 19 event

August 20 event

August 22 event

August 23 event

August 24 event

August 25 event

August 26 event

August 27 event

August 28 event

August 29 event

See also

 Tornadoes of 2016
 List of United States tornadoes from April to May 2016
 List of United States tornadoes from September to December 2016

Notes

References

Tornadoes of 2016
2016 natural disasters in the United States
2016, 06
June 2016 events in the United States
July 2016 events in the United States
August 2016 events in the United States